The Vicariate Apostolic of Northern Germany, known for most of its existence as the Vicariate Apostolic of the Northern (or Nordic) Missions, was a Catholic missionary jurisdiction established on 28 April 1667. It belonged to a vicar apostolic in predominantly Protestant Northern Europe. 

On 7 August 1868, the occasion of completing separate jurisdictions for all of Scandinavia, the vicariate only continued to comprise small areas in Northern Germany and was thus renamed. With the integration of these areas into other Catholic dioceses, the vicariate ceased to exist on 13 August 1930.

History
The Reformation in the 16th century caused the Roman Catholic Church to lose almost all of Northern Europe. In 1582 the stray Catholics of Denmark, Finland, Northern Germany, Norway, and Sweden were placed under the jurisdiction of an Apostolic Nuncio to Cologne. The Congregation de propaganda fide, on its establishment in 1622, took charge of the vast missionary field, which at its third session it divided among the nuncio of Brussels (for the Catholics in Denmark and Norway), the nuncio at Cologne (much of Northern Germany) and the nuncio of Poland (Finland, Mecklenburg, and Sweden).

Following the organisational structure of the Church the apostolic vicariate included the diocesan areas of bishoprics, where Roman Catholic jurisdiction had effectively been abolished (see the list in section Dioceses comprised in the vicariate). This was partially due to (1) secular rulers or governments repressing Catholic faith and clergy in their territories, which comprised the diocesan areas, (2) due to the fact that incumbent bishops had converted to Lutheranism, or (3) because the cathedral capitular canons, responsible for electing new bishops, had adopted Lutheranism and thus chose fellow faithful candidates, who thus de facto ascended the sees (typical for prince-bishoprics in Northern Germany).

So while the area under the jurisdiction of the vicar apostolic followed originally the diocesan boundaries of the de facto defunct bishoprics, the boundaries of new jurisdictions followed mostly the political borders relevant at the time of their establishment (See the list in the section States and territories covered by the vicariate below).

The scattered Catholics in Northern Europe were placed under the pastoral care of the Jesuits, Franciscans and Dominicans. Catholics in many places had at their disposal only the chapels established in the houses of the diplomatic representatives of the Holy Roman (becoming – as of 1806 – the Austrian) Emperor and of other Catholic Powers, France and Spain. Sometimes admission even to these chapels was rendered difficult, or entirely prohibited to native Catholics.

In some districts the conversion of the monarchs, e.g. Duke John Frederick of Brunswick and Lunenburg, Prince of Calenberg (1651) and Duke Christian I Louis of Mecklenburg-Schwerin (1663), brought Catholics some measure of freedom. The number of Catholics having increased in 1667, chiefly through the above-mentioned Prince of Calenberg, a vicariate Apostolic was established for Northern Germany.

The first vicar was Valerio Maccioni, titular Bishop of Morocco, who resided at Hanover. He died in 1676, and was succeeded by the celebrated Danish convert Nicolaus Steno, who in 1680 was obliged to leave Hanover, was made Auxiliary Bishop of Münster, and in 1683 returned to the Nordic Missions. He died at Schwerin in 1686, and was followed in the vicariate successively by Friedrich von Hörde, Auxiliary Bishop of Hildesheim and titular Bishop of Joppe (1686–96), Jobst Edmund von Brabeck, Bishop of Hildesheim (1697–1702) and Otto von Bronckhorst, Auxiliary Bishop of Osnabrück.

The Northern Missions, viewed in a wider sense, included also the Apostolic Prefectures of Schleswig-Holstein, coinciding with the Prussian province of that name, of Denmark and of Norway, which were placed under separate prelates in 1868. The vicariate and prefectures were under the permanent jurisdiction of the Bishop of Osnabrück as administrator Apostolic. In the vicariate, corresponding mostly to the Prussian province of Schleswig-Holstein, Catholics numbered about 79,400 (with 1,925,000 members of other confessional denominations), under 47 secular priests having care of 17 parishes and 17 mission stations. The following religious congregations had houses in the vicariate: Sisters of Mercy of St. Charles Borromeo, 1; Sisters of St. Elizabeth (Grey Nuns), 5; Franciscan Sisters, 2; Ursulines, 2. The Prefecture Apostolic of Schleswig-Holstein had in 1909: 11 parishes, 31 mission stations, 34 secular priests, 35,900 Catholics, and 550,000 of other beliefs; 4 communities of Sisters of St. Elizabeth and 3 of Franciscan nuns.

In summer the Catholic population in the vicariate of Northern Germany and prefecture of Schleswig-Holstein was increased by 17,000 to 20,000 labourers (chiefly Poles) from other parts of Germany, who returned to their homes at the beginning of the winter. The spiritual interests of the faithful were inadequately attended to owing to the extent of the parishes, the lack of priests, the poverty of the majority of the Catholics and in many places the hostility of the Protestant state or municipal governments. A more encouraging picture was presented by the numerous Catholic societies and by the maintenance of private Catholic schools, despite the fact that the Catholics were often obliged to contribute also to the support of the state and Protestant parish schools. A very fruitful activity has been developed in these missions by the Boniface Association.

The French Revolution and the Napoleonic regime brought great relief to Catholics in many cities and states; but the equality granted them by law in some countries was often merely theoretical.

At the reorganisation of Catholic affairs in Germany after the Napoleonic era (see Rheinbund), the greater part of the Northern Missions was added to adjacent bishoprics. The only districts remaining mission territory were the Kingdom of Saxony, the Principality of Anhalt, constituted separate vicariates Apostolic in 1816 and 1825 respectively, and the North, which in 1826 was placed temporarily under the jurisdiction of the Bishop of Paderborn.

In 1839 Pope Gregory XVI wished to entrust the vicariate to a bishop with his see at Hamburg. Johann Theodor Laurent was appointed vicar and consecrated bishop. Lutheran opposition prevented the realisation of the plan and Laurent was denied to enter Hamburg. The pope thereupon gave the administration of the vicariate to the Auxiliary Bishop of Osnabrück,  (d. 1855). The Bishop of Osnabrück has since then been the regular Vicar Apostolic of the Northern Missions, and administrator of the Prefecture Apostolic of Schleswig-Holstein since its separation from the vicariate in 1868. In 1869 Denmark and Norway were erected into apostolic prefectures of their own, and in 1892 into apostolic vicariates.

Defunct dioceses comprised in the vicariate
On its establishment the Apostolic Vicariate comprised first only the Diocese of Minden. The other former Catholic dioceses followed at three later dates (given in the list). The date in the second column refers to the year, when last time a catholic bishop could effectively wield his pontificate, not an eventual later appointment or continued titulature in exile. Some last Catholic bishops (like in Minden and Verden) had already been preceded by Lutheran incumbents.

The list below records the bishoprics whose diocesan areas fell under the jurisdiction of the Nordic Missions (renamed into Nordic Missions of Northern Germany on 7 August 1868 on the occasion of completing separate jurisdictions for all of Scandinavia). The list shows when the various diocesan areas left the (and eventually returned to the) jurisdiction of the Nordic Missions, to which Roman Catholic jurisdictions the areas used to belong afterwards, and to which jurisdictions they belong today. Today the areas of some defunct dioceses are partitioned among several modern dioceses. By clicking on the buttons the list can be ordered along the categories given in each column. The list does not claim to record the correct affiliations for every area of the former dioceses.

States and territories covered by the vicariate
The states and territories covered by the vicariate altered over the long duration of its existence. So the table below tries to present those states and territories which were part of the vicariate before it was territorially reduced for the first time on 6 April 1709.

Owing to its vast extent, Pope Clement XI divided the old Vicariate Apostolic into two vicariates: the Vicariate Apostolic of Upper and Lower Saxony, embracing the portions of the old vicariate situated in the Palatinate and in Lower Saxon Electoral Hanover and the Duchy of Bremen (with the Westphalian Principality of Verden), as well as in Upper Saxon Anhalt (in its then four princely subdivisions), Electoral Brandenburg (comprising the March of Brandenburg and Farther Pomerania), Swedish Hither Pomerania, and Electoral Saxony (still without the 1635-acquired Bohemian fief of Upper and Lower Lusatia). This new Apostolic Vicariate was seated in Hanover city (and thus also called Apostolic Vicariate of Hanover). It was placed in charge of Agostino Steffani, Bishop of Spiga and minister of the Elector Palatine, as vicar Apostolic.

So the rest of the original vicariate, comprising all of Northern Europe north of the Elbe, and Bremen, remained with the Nordic Missions, which retained the title of Vicariate of the North. It was placed under the Auxiliary Bishop of Osnabrück. Since 1743 the Roman Catholics in the Wettin-held imperial fief of Electorate of Saxony were subject to the Apostolic Vicariate of the Saxon Hereditary Lands, later also acceded by Reuss Elder Line, Reuss Younger Line, and Saxe-Altenburg. Saxon Hereditary Lands merged with the Apostolic Prefecture of Upper Lusatia (comprising the post-Napoleonic remainder of Wettin-held Upper Lusatia) into the new Diocese of Meissen on 24 June 1921.

The division between the Nordic Missions and the Upper and Lower Saxon vicariate lasted until 1779/80, when Friedrich Wilhelm von Westphalen, Prince-Bishop of Hildesheim, reunited under his administration the vicariates. On 11 February 1780 the territorially lessened Vicariate of Upper and Lower Saxony remerged into the Nordic Missions. Three years later the Apostolic Vicariate of Sweden was established, then competent for Roman Catholics in the Swedish Empire with Finland and Sweden proper. The Swedish-held imperial fief in Hither Pomerania remained with the Nordic Missions, also after it became Prussian in 1815.

With Pomerania and the March of Brandenburg having ceased to be parts of the Holy Roman Empire in 1806, but become provinces of Prussia, the latter agreed with the Holy See to place the Prussian part of the Nordic Missions under the jurisdictions of neighbouring Prussian dioceses as of 16 August 1821. Thus the Prince-Bishop of Breslau took direct responsibility for the now Prussian-held part of Meissen's former diocesan areas in then Brandenburgian Lower Lusatia and then Silesian (eastern) Upper Lusatia. Breslau wielded its indirect jurisdiction in the remainder of Brandenburg (including Berlin) and most of Pomerania (except of Lauenburg and Bütow Land) by its new Prince-Episcopal Delegation for Brandenburg and Pomerania (staffed in 1824). The diocesan areas of the defunct bishoprics in Prussian Saxony came under the jurisdiction of the Diocese of Paderborn, as was the case with the diocesan area of defunct Minden in Prussian Westphalia.

Also in the Kingdom of Hanover the diocesan areas of defunct bishoprics (Bremen, Verden) were assigned to the neighbouring existing dioceses of Hildesheim and of Osnabrück on 26 March 1824 (Bull "Impensa Romanorum Pontificum").

Also Brunswick (succeeding Brunswick-Wolfenbüttel) and meanwhile only tripartite Anhalt left the Nordic Missions in 1825, but without a persisting domestic Catholic diocese and only few domestic Catholics they formed an Apostolic Vicariate of their own, also acceded by Saxe-Gotha, Schwarzburg-Rudolstadt, and Schwarzburg-Sondershausen. In 1834 Brunswick, leaving Anhalt apostolic vicariate, merged into the jurisdiction of neighbouring Hanoveran Hildesheim diocese and Norway, leaving the Nordic Missions, became part of the Swedish vicariate the same year. At this time all of Northern Europe formed separate Roman Catholic jurisdictions and had left the Nordic Missions:
 Apostolic Vicariate of Sweden (already est. on 23 September 1783)
 Metropolitan Archdiocese of Mohilev (competent for Finland since the Russian takeover in 1809)
 Apostolic Prefecture of Schleswig-Holstein (est. on 29 July 1868; however, yet without Saxe-Lauenburg, Lübeck free city and Lübeck principality),
 Apostolic Prefecture of Denmark (est. on 7 August 1868; with Faroe Islands, Greenland and Iceland)
 Apostolic Prefecture of Norway (est. on 7 August 1868)

Simultaneously with the establishment of the Danish and Norwegian apostolic prefectures the Nordic Missions had been reduced to small member states in the North German Confederation (thus renamed to Apostolic Vicariate of Northern Germany on 7 August 1868), such as the Grand Duchies of Mecklenburg-Schwerin and Mecklenburg-Strelitz, the Duchy of Saxe-Lauenburg (part of Prussia as of 1876), the Hanseatic free cities of Bremen (without Bremerhaven), Hamburg (still with Cuxhaven) and Lübeck, the Principalities of Lübeck (capital Eutin), and Schaumburg-Lippe, and the British Island of Helgoland (joined Germany in 1891).

The table below shows the territories and states at the beginning of the 18th century and how new jurisdictions developed over the centuries. The table can be sorted by the territories and states, the empires they used to belonged to, the years they belonged to the Apostolic Vicariate of the Nordic Missions, and the names of the present jurisdictions by clicking on the buttons.

Vicars Apostolic 
 Francis of Wartenberg (1645–1661; for the former Archdiocese of Bremen only)

Vicars Apostolic for the Nordic Missions
 1667–1676: 
 1677–1686: Nicolas Steno
 1680–1683: Ferdinand von Fürstenberg (for Bremen, Halberstadt, Magdeburg and the Mecklenburgian duchies, former dioceses of Ratzeburg and Schwerin), simultaneously Prince-Bishop of Paderborn (1661–1683) and Münster (1678–1683, died)
 1687–1696: Friedrich von Tietzen called Schlüter
 1697–1702: , simultaneously Prince-Bishop of Hildesheim (1688–1702, died)
 1702–1713: 
 1713–1715: Sede vacante
 1715–1716: 
 1716–1718: Sede vacante
 1718–1719:  (died in 1719), simultaneously auxiliary bishop of Osnabrück and bishop of the titular see of Heliopolis in Augustamnica
 1719–1722: Sede vacante
 1722–1761: , simultaneously canon at Osnabrück's St. Peter's Cathedral and bishop of the titular see of Flaviopolis (1723–1761, died)
 1761–1774: 
 1775–1789: , simultaneously Prince-Bishop of Hildesheim (1763–1789) and Paderborn (1782–1789)
 1789–1825: , simultaneously Prince-Bishop of Hildesheim (1789–1825) and Paderborn (1825–1839)
 1825–1839: Sede vacante
 1839–1841: Jean-Théodore Laurent (resigned after Prussian obstruction), simultaneously bishop of the titular see of Chersonesus in Creta, Vicar Apostolic of Luxembourg (1841–1848, deposed after Luxembourgian pressure, resigned in 1856)
 1841–1921: Sede vacante
 1858–1895: Paulus Melchers as provicar per pro
 1899–1914:  as provicar per pro, simultaneously Bishop of Osnabrück (1899–1914, died)
 1914–1921:  as provicar per pro
 1921–1930: Hermann Wilhelm Berning, simultaneously Bishop of Osnabrück (1914–1955, died)

Vicars Apostolic for Upper and Lower Saxony

 1709–1722: Agostino Steffani (resigned in protest of lacking financial support from the Vatican)
 1722–1726: Sede vacante
 1722–1723: Ludolf Wilhelm von Majus as provicar per pro
 1726–1728: Agostino Steffani (returned after fulfillment of his claims)
 1730–1745: Leopold Heinrich Wilhelm von Schorror (resigned)
 1745–1757: Johann Wilhelm von Twickel (died in 1757)
 1757–1760: Sede vacante
 1757–1759: Volradus Christian Müller as provicar per pro
 1759–1760: Jodokus Joseph Walmer as provicar per pro
 1760–1779:  (died in 1779)
 1779–1780: Sede vacante

The remainder of the vicariate, after secession of Hereditary Saxony vicariate in 1743, remerged into the Nordic Missions in 1780.

Vicars Apostolic for the Saxon Hereditary Lands
In 1743 the Vicariate Apostolic for Saxon Hereditary Lands was disentangled from the Upper and Lower Saxony vicariate.

 1743–1749: Ludwig Li(e)geritz
 1749–1763: Leo Rauch
 1763–1764: Augustin Eggs
 1764–1800: Franz Herz (died in 1800)
 1801–1818: , bishop of the titular see of Argos (1816–1818, died)
 1819–1841:  (brother of the next), simultaneously bishop of the titular see of Pella, also Apostolic Prefect of Upper Lusatia (1831–1841, died; i.e. the Upper Lusatian share of defunct ancient Meissen diocese)
 1841–1845:  (died in 1845; brother of the former), simultaneously bishop of the titular see of Rama
 1846–1853:  (died in 1853), simultaneously Apostolic Prefect of Upper Lusatia, and bishop of the titular see of Corycus.
 1854–1875:  (died in 1875), simultaneously Apostolic Prefect of Upper Lusatia, and bishop of the titular see of Leontopolis in Augustamnica.
 1876–1890:  (died in 1890), simultaneously Apostolic Prefect of Upper Lusatia, and bishop of the titular see of Azotus (Ashdod)
 1890–1900:  (resigned), simultaneously Apostolic Prefect of Upper Lusatia, and bishop of the titular see of Cucusus
 1900–1903: Sede vacante
 1900–1903: Carl Maaz as provicar per pro
 1903–1905: , simultaneously bishop of the titular see of Samos, further Apostolic Prefect of Upper Lusatia (1904–1905, died)
 1906–1914:  (died in 1914)
 1915–1920:  (died in 1920)
 1920–1921: Sede vacante
 1920–1921:  as provicar per pro (resigned), simultaneously Apostolic Prefect of Upper Lusatia

References

 

Northern Germany
History of Catholicism in Germany
Religious organizations established in 1667
Religious organizations disestablished in 1930
1667 establishments in the Holy Roman Empire